Dendrobates is a genus of poison dart frogs native to Central and South America. It once contained numerous species, but most originally placed in this genus have been split off into other genera such as Adelphobates, Ameerega, Andinobates, Epipedobates, Excidobates, Oophaga, Phyllobates and Ranitomeya (essentially all the brightly marked poison dart frogs; i.e. excluding the duller genera in the family like  Colostethus and Hyloxalus), leaving only five large to medium-sized species in the genus Dendrobates. All the other genera used to be grouped in with Dendrobates because it was previously thought that all brightly colored poison dart frogs came from the same ancestor but this has since been proven to be incorrect.  Dendrobates and Phyllobates evolved conspicuous coloration from the same common ancestor but not the same as any of the other genera listed above.

There is accumulating evidence that Dendrobates are diet specialists and sequester the toxin found on their skin from their diet. It has been found that diet specialization evolved in tandem with conspicuous coloration in the case of Dendrobates.

The generic name Dendrobates is derived from the Greek words δένδρον dendron "tree" and βάτης batēs "one that treads", meaning ‘tree climber’.

Species

References

External links

 
Poison dart frogs
Amphibians of Central America
Amphibians of South America
Amphibian genera
Taxa named by Johann Georg Wagler